Trechus angelicae is a species of ground beetle in the subfamily Trechinae. It was described by Reitter in 1892.

References

angelicae
Beetles described in 1892